Thunder formerly known as p3 (Air-launched missile) is a family of Precision-Guided Munition guided by Global Positioning System and laser-guided pointing, manufactured by Halcon Systems a subsidiary of EDGE Group.

Variants 

 THUNDER P31
 THUNDER P32
 THUNDER P4

Users 

  In 2021, Halcon signed with UAE air force to deliver Thunder system and Desert Sting to the armed forces worth $880 million (AED3.2 billion)

References 

Missiles